Pat Coyle (born September 5, 1960) is an American women's basketball coach. She was the head coach of Saint Peter's, between 2013 and 2018. She has served as an assistant coach for the University of Pittsburgh Panthers women's basketball team. Coyle coached in the WNBA with the New York Liberty. Serving as the Liberty's assistant coach beginning in 1998, then attained the head coaching seat during the 2004 season (after the departure of Richie Adubato). The Coyle-led Liberty reached the playoffs in 2004, 2005, 2007, and 2008, but never won the Eastern Conference Championship.

In 2009, the Liberty started their season 6-11 despite a roster made up primarily of healthy, returning players. The team announced on July 31, 2009 that Coyle had been relieved of her duties, and that assistant coach Anne Donovan would take over as interim head coach.

Prior to joining the Liberty as an assistant coach in 1998, Coyle was the head women's basketball coach at Loyola University Maryland . There, Coyle amassed a 100-77 (.565) record in over six seasons, making her the winningest coach in Loyola history. She led the Greyhounds to the Metro Atlantic Athletic Conference Championships and the NCAA Division I women's basketball tournament in 1994 and 1995. Coyle also held assistant coaching posts during the 1980s at the University of Miami, Rutgers University, and St. Joseph's College.

Coyle was a star basketball player at Rutgers University, from which she graduated in 1982. She was named to the Rutgers Athletics Hall of Fame in 1993.

Coyle hails originally from Philadelphia, Pennsylvania.

References 

1960 births
Living people
American women's basketball coaches
American women's basketball players
Basketball coaches from Pennsylvania
Basketball players from Philadelphia
Loyola Greyhounds women's basketball coaches
Miami Hurricanes women's basketball coaches
New York Liberty head coaches
Pittsburgh Panthers women's basketball coaches
Rutgers Scarlet Knights women's basketball coaches
Rutgers Scarlet Knights women's basketball players
Saint Joseph's Hawks women's basketball coaches
Saint Peter's Peacocks women's basketball coaches